Gary Mark Bennett (born 10 December 1971) is a former English cricketer.  Bennett was a right-handed batsman who bowled right-arm medium pace.  He was born at Taunton, Somerset.

Bennett represented the Somerset Cricket Board in 2 List A matches against Bedfordshire in the 2nd round of the 1999 NatWest Trophy and Staffordshire in the 1st round of the 2000 NatWest Trophy.  In his 2 List A matches, he scored 6 runs at a batting average of 3.00, with a high score of 5.

References

External links
Gary Bennett at Cricinfo
Gary Bennett at CricketArchive

1971 births
Living people
English cricketers
Somerset Cricket Board cricketers
Sportspeople from Taunton